is a railway station in the town of Shinchi, Fukushima Prefecture, Japan, operated by East Japan Railway Company (JR East). Operation of the station was suspended due to severe damage to the railway and station facilities caused by the 2011 Tōhoku earthquake and tsunami in March 2011. The station reopened at a new location in December 2016.

Lines
The station is attended.

Station layout
Prior to the 2011 Tōhoku earthquake and tsunami, Shinchi Station previously had a single island platform and a single side platform connected to the station building by a footbridge. The station was rebuilt with two opposed side platforms.

Platforms

History
Shinchi Station opened on November 10, 1897. The station was absorbed into the JR East network upon the privatization of the Japanese National Railways (JNR) on April 1, 1987.

The station was totally destroyed by the 2011 Tōhoku earthquake and tsunami on 11 March 2011. It reopened at a new location further inland on 10 December 2016.

Passenger statistics
In 2018, the station was used by an average of 281 passengers daily (boarding passengers only).

Surrounding area

Shinchi town hall
Shinchi post office
Tsurushi fishing port

See also
 List of railway stations in Japan

References

External links

  

Stations of East Japan Railway Company
Railway stations in Fukushima Prefecture
Jōban Line
Railway stations in Japan opened in 1897
Shinchi, Fukushima
Buildings damaged by the 2011 Tōhoku earthquake and tsunami